Kenneth Cody Earl Ellison (born October 22, 1989 in Fresno, California) is an American soccer player, currently playing for Fresno Fuego in the USL Premier Development League.

External links
 USL profile

1989 births
Living people
American soccer players
Fresno Fuego players
Charleston Battery players
Association football defenders
Soccer players from California
USL League Two players
USL Championship players